Thomas William Murphy (born 19 December 1991) is an English semi-professional footballer who plays for Cray Wanderers.

Career
The striker made his debut for Gillingham in the Football League Trophy 1–0 defeat against Colchester United on 7 October 2008, replacing Andy Barcham as a substitute in the 74th minute.

He joined Lewes as his next club but after scoring five goals in 30 appearances he was released on 7 February 2011 joining fellow Conference South side Thurrock on 25 February 2011. On 25 June 2011 Murphy signed for Horsham and then in February 2012 for Margate.

After a fruitful spell at Dover Athletic, Murphy signed for newly promoted Maidstone United in the summer of 2016. He joined Eastbourne Borough on loan in November 2016. The following month, at the conclusion of the loan spell, he joined Dartford on a permanent deal.

On 20 November 2018, Murphy returned to Margate on an initial month's loan from Dartford.

On 24 December 2018, Murphy was loaned to Tonbridge Angels on an initial month's loan from Dartford.

On 30 July 2019, Murphy joined Cray Wanderers for the 2019–20 season.

References

External links
Gillingham profile

1991 births
Living people
Footballers from Bexley
English footballers
Association football forwards
Gillingham F.C. players
Lewes F.C. players
Thurrock F.C. players
Farnborough F.C. players
Horsham F.C. players
Margate F.C. players
Dover Athletic F.C. players